Phylloteras is a North American genus of gall wasps in the family Cynipidae,

tribe Cynipini (oak gall wasps).

Species
There are at least 4 described species in Phylloteras,

possibly 11 total.

 Phylloteras cupella (Weld)—urn gall wasp
 Phylloteras poculum (Osten-Sacken, 1862)
 Phylloteras sigma (Weld)
 Phylloteras volutellae Ashmead, 1897—conical oak gall wasp

References

Further reading

External links

Cynipidae
Hymenoptera genera
Gall-inducing insects
Taxa named by William Harris Ashmead